Past, Present, Future is New Zealand based musician Tiki Taane's platinum selling debut solo album. It features a fusion of Taane’s trademark bass-heavy production with traditional Māori instrumentation, a style which Taane describes as “punk dub meets tangatawhenua”.

Guest vocalists include Taane’s father Uekaha Taanetinorau and grandmother Inuwai, as well as PDigsss (Shapeshifter), Julia Deans (Fur Patrol), Celia Church, and Zaniah Carigiet.

Tracks

1. Whakapuaki 
"Whakapuaki" means ‘an awakening’, Taane's brother-in-law wrote the lyrics and his father performed them. Taane sees Whakapuaki as acknowledging the higher forces, the higher entities and the listeners, then clearing space to allow the listener to properly listen through the whole album.

2. Tangaroa 
"Tangaroa" means ‘God of the Sea’. This was the first song Taane wrote for the album, starting it four years before recording. Tangaroa includes tribal elements with a haka performed by Taane's father on top.

3. Now This Is It 
Sean Deans (Bass Frontiers) wrote the beat for "Now This Is It", while Taane wrote the verses and choruses. Zaniah from Kobra Kai in Sydney sang the intro/outro.

4. Our Favourite Target 
Taane played the drums on this track, which features Julia Deans from Fur Patrol on vocals.

5. Faded 
Sean Deans wrote the dancehall beat, while P Diggs performed a duet with Taane, as well as co-writing the song. The song is about friendship, respect, love and admiration.

6. Saviour Dub 
Motive from Melbourne produced most of the beat for this track, which features a "reggae jungle crossover sound".

7. Always on My Mind 
This track features Taane on acoustic guitar and vocals. Taane wrote "Always on My Mind" for his ex-girlfriend. A triumph of song writing and performing, "Always on my Mind" held the number one spot in the New Zealand top 40 chart for over nine weeks, and remained in the top 40 for over 40 weeks, over 30 of which were spent in the top 15.

8. Wotcha Got 
"Wotcha Got" features Evan Short from Concord Dawn on heavy metal guitar, and live drumming from Uncle Deaks (Salmonella Dub). This track was going to be on the new Salmonella Dub album, but they turned it down.

9. Always on My Mind Dub 
Taane played the simple drum loop on this track, which also features a string quartet from Wellington. Taane says "The original version of "Always on My Mind" is pretty happy and up-tempo, so I wanted to do something that was sad and said “I miss you”."

10. Music Has Saved Me 
"Music Has Saved Me" features a P-Money beat. The song pays homage to music and the positive effect it has had on Taane's life. The chorus is inspired by a line from Ini Kamoze's "World A Music".

11. Past, Present, Future 
The title track features vocals from Taane's grandmother, who had died about fifteen years earlier. The vocals come from a tape recording of her singing one of her babies to sleep in the 1970s. The song doesn’t have a beat; Taane arranged some strings and noises around the vocal. Taane is paying tribute to the Māori tradition of recording history through waiata or song.

12. It’s All In Your Head 
Taane plays drums, bass, piano, and keys on this track. Celia Church sings the main vocal.

13. Tainui Waka 
This track pays tribute to the people of the Tainui waka, one of the traditional original canoes to bring the Māori people to Aotearoa/New Zealand. The track was inspired by a vision Taane had while sitting on the beach which was the launch point for the Tainui Waka, while he was on a spiritual journey to Rarotonga.

Charts
Taane's first solo single, "Always On My Mind" has been certified platinum and made it to number one in New Zealand, knocking Chris Brown off the top spot after an eight-week reign. The album Past, Present, Future has also been certified platinum in New Zealand and peaked at number four on the charts.

References

 Tiki Taane Profile, Muzic.net.nz
 lumiere.net.nz review

External links
 tikidub.com
 
 

2007 albums
Tiki Taane albums